Sara Cosette Billey (born February 6, 1968 in Alva, Oklahoma, United States) is an American mathematician working in algebraic combinatorics. She is known for her contributions on Schubert polynomials, singular loci of Schubert varieties, Kostant polynomials, and Kazhdan–Lusztig polynomials often using computer verified proofs. She is currently a professor of mathematics at the University of Washington.

Billey did her undergraduate studies at the Massachusetts Institute of Technology, graduating in 1990.
She earned her Ph.D. in mathematics in 1994 from the University of California, San Diego, under the joint supervision of Adriano Garsia and Mark Haiman. She returned to MIT as a postdoctoral researcher with Richard P. Stanley, and continued there as an assistant and associate professor until 2003, when she moved to the University of Washington.

In 2012, she became a fellow of the American Mathematical Society.

Publications

Selected books

Selected articles

References

External links
 
 
 

1968 births
Massachusetts Institute of Technology School of Science alumni
University of California, San Diego alumni
Massachusetts Institute of Technology faculty
University of Washington faculty
Combinatorialists
20th-century American mathematicians
21st-century American mathematicians
Living people
American women mathematicians
Fellows of the American Mathematical Society
People from Alva, Oklahoma
Mathematicians from Oklahoma
20th-century women mathematicians
21st-century women mathematicians
20th-century American women
21st-century American women
Recipients of the Presidential Early Career Award for Scientists and Engineers